Friedrich Karl Arnold Schwassmann (25 March 1870 – 19 January 1964) was a German astronomer and a discoverer of 22 minor planets and 4 comets, who worked at AOP in Potsdam and at Bergedorf Observatory in Hamburg.

He was co-discoverer with Arno Arthur Wachmann of the periodic comets 29P/Schwassmann–Wachmann, 31P/Schwassmann–Wachmann and 73P/Schwassmann–Wachmann, and with Arno Arthur Wachmann and Leslie Peltier of the non-periodic comet C/1930 D1 (Peltier–Schwassmann–Wachmann). The main-belt asteroid 989 Schwassmannia, discovered by himself in 1922, was later named in his honor.

List of discovered minor planets

See also

References 
 

1870 births
1964 deaths
Discoverers of asteroids
Discoverers of comets
 
19th-century German astronomers
20th-century German astronomers